The 28th GLAAD Media Awards was the 2017 annual presentation of the GLAAD Media Awards, presented by GLAAD honoring the 2016 season. The awards honor films, television shows, musicians and works of journalism that fairly and accurately represent the LGBT community and issues relevant to the community. GLAAD announced 115 nominees in 21 English-language categories and 41 Spanish-language nominees in 11 categories on January 31, 2017.  The awards were presented at ceremonies in Los Angeles on April 1, 2017 and New York on May 6, 2017.

Winners and nominees
Winners are presented in bold.

English-language categories

References

28
2017 awards in the United States
2017 in New York City
2017 in Los Angeles